Faraja Damas Lazaro (born 25 July 1997) is a Tanzanian long-distance runner.

In 2019, he competed in the senior men's race at the 2019 IAAF World Cross Country Championships held in Aarhus, Denmark. He finished in 49th place.

References

External links 
 

Living people
1997 births
Place of birth missing (living people)
Tanzanian male long-distance runners
Tanzanian male cross country runners